FarmHouse (FH) is a social fraternity founded at the University of Missouri on April 15, 1905.  It became a national organization in 1921.  Today FarmHouse has 33 active chapters and four associate chapters (formerly colonies) in the United States and Canada.

History
FarmHouse was founded as a professional agriculture fraternity on April 15, 1905 by seven men at the University of Missouri, who  had met at a YMCA bible study and had decided that they wanted to form a club.  The seven founders were D. Howard Doane, Robert F. Howard, Claude B. Hutchison, H. H. Krusekopf, Earl W. Rusk, Henry P. Rusk, and Melvin E. Sherwin. D. Howard Doane conceived the basic ideas which led to FarmHouse, and is considered the father of the Fraternity.

The name FarmHouse was chosen for the following reasons:Given their agricultural background and rural upbringing, the house in which they resided began to be referred to as the farmer’s house, by other students in a derogatory or demeaning way. The men living in the house however felt the name was appropriate as they knew the farm home to be a welcoming place for people to gather, to enjoy each other’s fellowship, to share a meal together, after a hard day’s work. This same welcoming environment of a farm home could be offered on a college campus, for studious men majoring in agriculture who possessed a strong work ethic. And so the group proudly took on the name FARMHOUSE.A second chapter, founded independently of the Missouri chapter but sharing the same ideals, was founded at the University of Nebraska in 1911.  After communication between the two groups, a third chapter was founded at the University of Illinois in 1918.  FarmHouse became a national organization in 1921 by approval of each of the active chapters.  On April 20, 1974, the FarmHouse Club at the University of Alberta in Edmonton, Alberta, Canada, was the first chapter established outside the United States.  With the establishment of the Alberta chapter, FarmHouse became an international fraternity.

FarmHouse joined the North American Interfraternity Conference as a junior member in 1944.  Because of its size at the time, eight chapters, it was not considered eligible for full membership.  With twelve chapters and three colonies, FarmHouse became a full-fledged member on March 25, 1953. FarmHouse dropped out of the NIC from 1971 to 1981, as did many other national and international fraternities.

In 1974, the Fraternity re-affirmed its alcohol free housing stance by passing the stance in the bylaws at the Conclave of that year. in 1998, the NIC awarded FarmHouse the NIC Laurel Wreath for leading the path in alcohol free housing.

In 1984 Conclave, the Fraternity unanimousely pass a "Proposal for the Establishment of an Agricultural Sorority". Three of the women's groups which had been affiliated with FarmHouse (Colorado State University, University of Alberta, and California State Polytechnic University, Pomona) for at least the previous two years indicated that they wanted to be a part of forming the proposed ag-related women's fraternity or sorority. In 1985, the first chapter of Ceres was chartered.

Mission and ritual

The mission of FarmHouse Fraternity is primarily prescribed within what is known as "The Object" of the fraternity:“The object of our Fraternity is to promote good fellowship, to encourage studiousness, and to inspire its members in seeking the best in their chosen lines of study, as well as in life.  Progress shall mark our every step, the spirit of congeniality shall reign at all times, and every member shall be honest with himself, as with his brothers. Men elected to our membership are considered to be of good moral character, to be high in scholarship, to have the capacity for meeting and making friends, and to give promise of service to their fellow men and to the world. To be and become such may at times require a sacrifice of time, pleasures and comforts.”The object is recited members at all chapter rituals and regular chapter meetings.</ref>

The motto of FarmHouse is "Builders of Men". The fraternity seeks to build men with "Fourfold Development", encouraging growth in the intellectual, physical, social/moral and spiritual aspects of their lives.

The name FarmHouse is an acronym standing for Faith, Ambition, Reverence, Morality, Honesty, Obedience, Unity, Service, and Excellence.  FarmHouse does not have greek letters and contrary to some rumors, does not have "secret" greek letters.

The ritual of FarmHouse is open and non-secretive. Families of members are often encouraged to attend initiations.

Membership 
To become a member of FarmHouse Fraternity, an undergraduate must be extended a bid, or offer of membership, by a chapter of the fraternity at their university.  Chapters regularly host recruitment, or rush, events to get to know potential new members, in addition to inviting them over to dinner or a tour of the chapter facility.  Every chapter has an officer in charge of recruitment in addition to the responsibility for all chapter members to identify and recruit new members who live by FarmHouse values.

New membership 

New members are men who have accepted a bid extended to them by a chapter of the fraternity.  New membership is officially conferred during the course of the Star Ceremony.  During the Star Ceremony new members are officially recognized by the chapter as brothers and are given their new member pin.  The Star Ceremony is also considered to be the beginning of new member education.  New member education is the period before initiation as a chapter member where new members learn about the history and values of the fraternity.  New member education is led by an elected officer of the chapter known as the Director of New Member Education and lasts a maximum of twelve weeks.  Once a new member completes new member education, he is considered for initiation as a chapter member.

Chapter membership 

Chapter members are men who have been initiated as a member of a chapter of the fraternity.  Members are elected to membership by a vote of the chapter, commonly referred to as the initiation vote.  This vote reflects the new member's completion of new member education and that they are "considered to be of good moral character, to be high in scholarship, to have the capacity for meeting and making friends, and to give promise of service to their fellow men and to the world," as stated in the object.  Membership is officially conferred during the Pearl Ceremony, where members are given the standard badge of the fraternity, pledge to uphold the principles and standards of the fraternity, and sign their name in the official chapter membership record, known as the Herd Book.

Alumni membership 
Alumni members are men who have graduated from college or who have requested to leave the chapter prior to graduation but wish to maintain their membership in the fraternity.  If a man wishes to obtain early alumni status prior to graduation, he may be granted it upon approval of the chapter, by two-thirds vote, and the International Executive Director.  Alumni membership is officially conferred in the Ruby Ceremony and is considered to be the end of a member's chapter membership.  Upon becoming an alumni member, the man automatically becomes a member of the alumni association affiliated with his previous chapter, and if he moves to another state, will have dual-affiliation with the alumni association within that state.

Associate membership 
Associate members are men who having demonstrated the qualities of a FarmHouse man, shown interest in the fraternity, and having not joined a social fraternity while in college or afterwards, are granted membership in the fraternity.  Associate membership is granted by a local chapter, which the man automatically becomes an alumni member of.  In cases where no chapter exists, an association may grant alumni membership with the approval of the international executive director.  Associate members, just like chapter members, officially receive their membership through observing the Pearl Ceremony.

Honorary membership 
Honorary membership is conferred to men of high character and great professional achievement who embody the ideals of a FarmHouse man.  It is usually conferred during a Pearl Ceremony at a biennial conclave chaired by the International President.  Honorary members may be nominated by unanimous vote of a chapter, association board, or a special committee on honorary membership appointed by the International President.  Upon nomination, the candidate must be unanimously elected by the International Executive Board to receive honorary membership.  Honorary members have the full rights of any alumni member of the fraternity.

Awards 
FarmHouse recognizes the outstanding contributions of both members and non-members of the fraternity.

Master Builder of Men Award 
The Master Builder of Men award is the highest honor that the international fraternity can bestow upon an alumni member.  The award was created by the National Executive board in 1950.  The award is given biennially at each regular conclave of the fraternity.

Qualifications 
The Master Builder of Men Award is bestowed upon an alumni member who:possesses a continued interest in improving both the chapters and associations of the organization and is a leader in the Fraternity;

demonstrates interest in young people by providing help and encouragement, allowing them to better themselves through further development and growth;

embodies the Fraternity’s principles in his daily actions;

and, is a gentleman and respected citizen of his own personal and/ or professional community

Recipients

2022 
Steve Davis (Oklahoma State '77)

Ken Dunk (Arkansas '71)

Robert Graham (Mississippi State '69)

2020 
Frank Bezdicek (Minnesota '67)

Don Ferguson (Kansas State '63)

Larry Hageman (Ohio State '94)

Craig Harris (Iowa State '65)

2018 
Jack Anan (Colorado State '53)

Louis J. Boyd (Kentucky '53)

Senator Cory Gardner (Colorado State '95)

Tom Kopacek (Minnesota '70)

S. Warren Weibert (Kansas State '66)

2016 
Jim Tobin (Iowa State '76)

Ryan Downs (Nebraska '88)

Jim Herbert (Tennessee '61)

Wayne Engstrom (Washington '60)

Kent Horsager (Minnesota '81)

John Riley (Kansas State '79)

Barnes Award for Outstanding Interfraternalism 
The Barnes Award for Outstanding Interfraternalism is given to individuals who have made a significant impact to the large fraternal movement.  The award was created by the FarmHouse International Executive Board in 2012.  It is not necessarily given to a member of FarmHouse but rather to those who have contributed to the larger sorority and fraternity community.

Recipients 
Judson Horras - 2018

Ned Kirklin - 2017

Patrick Alderdice - 2016

Bobbi Larsen - 2015

Durward Owen - 2014

Ben Pendry - 2013

Rick Barnes - 2012

Controversies
In 2014 the FarmHouse chapter at the University of Nebraska-Lincoln was suspended after the alcohol related death of an 18-year-old freshman. Four FarmHouse members, including the chapter vice president, were brought up on felony procurement charges. The chapter is now reinstated. The death prompted State Senator Adam Morfeld to introduce a Good Samaritan law providing limited immunity to underage students who call for help in alcohol-related emergencies.

In October 2021, the FarmHouse chapter at the University of Kentucky contacted campus police "regarding reports of an unresponsive student." The student, later identified as Thomas "Lofton" Hazelwood, was taken to UK Albert B. Chandler Hospital in Lexington, Kentucky, where he was pronounced dead. A statement from the Fayette County Coroner said the 18-year-old's cause of death was "presumed alcohol toxicity."  On December 22, 2021, the Fraternity suspended the charter of the University of Kentucky chapter and issued a no-contact order prohibiting current members of the chapter from any contact with FarmHouse for a period of seven years.

Notable alumni

List of chapters

See also
List of social fraternities and sororities

References

External links

 
Student organizations established in 1905
International student societies
North American Interfraternity Conference
Student societies in the United States
Organizations based in Kansas City, Missouri
1905 establishments in Missouri